Lieskovec may refer to:

 Lieskovec, Humenné District in Slovakia
 Lieskovec, Zvolen District in Slovakia